The Division of Leichhardt is an Australian electoral division in Queensland.

Geography
Since 1984, federal electoral division boundaries in Australia have been determined at redistributions by a redistribution committee appointed by the Australian Electoral Commission. Redistributions occur for the boundaries of divisions in a particular state, and they occur every seven years, or sooner if a state's representation entitlement changes or when divisions of a state are malapportioned.

It is located in Far North Queensland and includes the Torres Strait Islands. It includes the local government areas of Cairns, Cook, Douglas, Torres and Wujal Wujal.

History

The division was first contested in 1949 after the expansion of seats in the Parliament of Australia. It is one of Australia's largest electorates, covering an area stretching from Cairns to Cape York and the Torres Strait, including the Torres Strait Islands.

The division is named after Ludwig Leichhardt, an explorer and scientist. The area was first covered by the seat of Herbert from 1901 to 1934 and then by the seat of Kennedy until 1949.

Most of the electorate is almost uninhabited except for small Aboriginal communities, but the extreme southeast, consisting of the northern half of the Wet Tropics, with rich volcanic soils instead of the extraordinarily infertile lateritic sands and gravels of Cape York proper, is quite densely populated and includes urban Cairns. There are small, intensive sugar cane, banana and mango farms in this region, though they are prone to damage from droughts and cyclones.

A safe Labor seat from the late 1950s to the 1970s, it has been marginal for most of the time since then. While Cairns has historically tilted toward Labor, the more rural areas tilt toward the Liberals and Nationals.

It was a bellwether seat held by the party of government from the 1972 election until the 2010 election. When Warren Entsch, who held the seat from 1996 to 2007, won it back for the LNP in 2010, he became the seat's first opposition member in four decades. It also marked the first time Labor had been in government without holding Leichhardt.

Ahead of the 2016 federal election, ABC psephologist Antony Green listed the seat in his election guide as one of eleven which he classed as "bellwether" electorates.

Members

Election results

References

External links
 Division of Leichhardt (Qld) — Australian Electoral Commission

Electoral divisions of Australia
Constituencies established in 1949
1949 establishments in Australia
Federal politics in Queensland
Far North Queensland
Cairns, Queensland